Roar is a programme broadcast on CBBC, in the UK, for children. It is presented by Rani Price and Johny Pitts.

Format
It is about the animals and keepers at Howletts and Port Lympne Wild Animal Parks. It is similar to another BBC series, Animal Park, filmed at Longleat Safari Park.

From series 6, it has moved from Howletts and Port Lympne to Longleat.

Roar: The Game
There is also a Roar game on the CBBC website, the 2010 version of which was developed by digital agency Fish in a bottle. In every Roar broadcast they give you a passcode to unlock a treat or animal for their game.

Presenters

Presenters
Alex Dolan (2006) 
Matthew Skilton (2006–2009)
Rani Price (2007–11)
Johny Pitts (2009–11)
Katie Phillips (2012–14)

Series

The series consisted of daily visits to all sections of the parks.

Roar: The Game was introduced during series 1 and was renamed Roar – 2010 Edition during Series 5. From series 6 a new addition called 'feeding time' was introduced. Cheat codes were given out during the episodes to access content on the website.

Roar – Reversions
Rani Price and Matthew Skilton with stories from Howletts and Port Lympne wild animal parks. This series aired from April 2008 and finished airing its 20 episodes in August 2008. In this series it contains the best moments of Roar from series 1 and 2. It is presented by Rani Price and Matthew Skilton.

References

External links
 
CBBC – Roar at bbc.co.uk
 

2006 British television series debuts
2014 British television series endings
2000s British children's television series
2010s British children's television series
BBC children's television shows
BBC high definition shows
English-language television shows
Films set in zoos
Television series by BBC Studios